148780 Altjira  is a binary classical Kuiper belt object (cubewano). The secondary, S/2007 (148780) 1, is large compared to the primary,  vs. . The Altjiran lightcurve is quite flat (Δmag<0.10), which is indicative of a "quasi-spherical body with a homogeneous surface".

The satellite's orbit has the following parameters: semi-major-axis, ; period, ; eccentricity, ; and inclination, (retrograde). The total system mass is about 4 kg.

It was named after the Arrernte creation deity, Altjira, who created the Earth during the Dreamtime and then retired to the sky.

References

External links
 

148780
148780
Named minor planets
Binary trans-Neptunian objects
20011020